Pogonia ophioglossoides, the snakemouth orchid or rose pogonia, is a species of orchid occurring from central Canada to the east-central and eastern United States. It is the type species of the genus Pogonia. It is pollinated by bees. This species occurs in wet habitats. In the north, the habitat is typically fens but sometimes also bogs. Further south, along the Gulf Coast, it is a species of wet pine savannas and flatwoods.

References

ophioglossoides
Orchids of Canada
Orchids of the United States
Plants described in 1753
Taxa named by Carl Linnaeus
Flora without expected TNC conservation status